USS Eagle, a brig, was launched 11 August 1814 as Surprise at Vergennes, Vermont, by Adam and Noah Brown. She was renamed Eagle 6 September and placed under the command of Lieutenant R. Henley. 

Barely finished in time to participate in the decisive Battle of Lake Champlain on 11 September 1814, Eagle rendered service. During the course of the battle she was holed 39 times and had 13 men killed and 20 wounded. After the battle she was laid up for preservation at Whitehall, New York, but was sold in 1825.

References
 

Brigs of the United States Navy
War of 1812 ships of the United States
Ships built in Vermont
1814 ships
1814 establishments in Vermont